Yunyan District is one of 6 urban districts of the prefecture-level city of Guiyang, the capital of Guizhou Province, China.
Yunyan has been the provincial seat of Guizhou since it was established as a province during the Ming dynasty. Yunyan has a majority Han population, and is home to other ethnic groups such as Miao, Buyi, Hui, and Shui.

History
Yunyan belonged to the Shunyuan Military Monitoring Department during the Yuan dynasty, and later the Guizhou Military Monitoring Department during the Ming dynasty. Since Guizhou's establishment as a province during the Ming dynasty, Yunyan has been the seat of the province. In August 1955, Guiyang's first district was renamed to Yunyan District, and its second district was renamed Fushui District. In 1958, Fushui was merged into Yunyan.

References

External links
Yunyan District, Guiyang official website

County-level divisions of Guizhou
Guiyang